is a Japanese semi-biographical comedy-drama streaming television series co-directed by Masaharu Take. Based on the non-fiction novel  by Nobuhiro Motohashi, it tells the story of Japanese adult video director Toru Muranishi. The series premiered on Netflix on August 8, 2019. It stars Takayuki Yamada as Muranishi, alongside Shinnosuke Mitsushima and Tetsuji Tamayama. On August 15, 2019, Netflix renewed the series for a second season, which premiered on June 24, 2021.

Synopsis
The Naked Director follows the story of "Muranishi's unusual and dramatic life filled with big ambitions as well as spectacular setbacks in his attempt to turn Japan's porn industry on its head."

Cast and characters
Takayuki Yamada as Toru Muranishi
Shinnosuke Mitsushima as Toshi Arai
Tetsuji Tamayama as Kenji Kawada
Ryo Ishibashi as Eigo Ikezawa, head of the largest pornography company
Lily Franky as Michiro Takei, a high-ranking police officer
Misato Morita as Megumi Sahara/Kaoru Kuroki
Jun Kunimura as Iori Furuya, head of Furuya Gang of the Tosho Syndicate of the yakuza
Takenori Goto as "Rugby" Goto
Tokio Emoto as Kosuke Mitamura
Sairi Ito as Junko Koseda
Koyuki as Kayo Sahara, Megumi's mother
Kimiko Yo as Kozue Muranishi, Toru's mother
Pierre Taki as Atsushi Wada
Mariya Nishiuchi as Sayaka
Yuri Tsunematsu as Miyuki Chiba/Mariko Nogi
Nanami Kawakami as Miku
Ami Tomite as Naoko Yamamoto
Yuka Masuda as Roma Edogawa
Shô Kasamatsu as Ogiwara, one of Iori Furuya's henchmen
Takato Yonemoto as Jimmy
Harmeet Obhrai as Abdallah
Itsuji Itao as Ono
Tsuyoshi Ihara as Koichi Umino, CEO of Satellite East
Renji Ishibashi as Watabe, chairman of the board of the conglomerate that owns Satellite East
Rie Miyazawa as Ms. Takamiya, successor to Takamiya Group
Eisaku Yoshida as Akira Honda (investment banker)
Jade Albany Pietrantonio as Allison Mandy (season 1)
Ruri Shinato as Sachiko (Toru Muranishi's first wife)

English version dubbing cast
James McCauley as Toru Muranishi
David Blue as Toshi Arai
Christopher Swindle as Ikezawa
Eric Tiede as Kawada
JJ Dunlap as "Rugby"
Curt Mega as Kosuke Mitamura
Siera Casey as Junko
Keith Silverstein as Takei
Maurice LaMarche as Furuya
Miranda Parkin as Naoko
Mark Hildreth as Ono
Mimi Torres as Miku
Dahlia Salem as Kayo

Episodes

Series overview

Season 1 (2019)

Season 2 (2021)

Production

Development
Executive producer Kazutaka Sakamoto came across Nobuhiro Motohashi's Zenra Kantoku Muranishi Toru Den in early 2017. A director friend of his had been trying to adapt it, but gave up and hoped Sakamoto could make it happen at Netflix. Although mainly taking place in the 1980s, Netflix expected it to be universal and relevant to contemporary viewers, and that it be a compelling underdog story. After the production was green-lit, Sakamoto brought in Jason George, a producer on the Netflix series Narcos, as a consultant. He wanted George's advice on depicting an outlaw character that viewers can empathize with and how to make sure the sex scenes would not come across as gratuitous or disrespectful to women. The discussions were so fruitful that Sakamoto had George supervise the script too.

On October 25, 2018, it was announced that Netflix had given the production a series order for a first season consisting of eight episodes. It was the first production for Netflix's Japanese branch. The series is co-directed by Masaharu Take and co-written by Kosuke Nishi, Yoshitatsu Yamada and Eiji Uchida. Mark Schilling reported that with "a generous (but undisclosed) budget", the writing team spent nearly a year crafting the script. The Nikkei reported that The Naked Director is estimated to have cost 100 million yen per episode, in contrast to most Japanese TV shows which cost tens of millions of yen per episode.

Take stated that without Netflix, the project would not have been realized as it would have been hard to get it on Japanese television. He said that the story is a mix of true story and fiction, as Muranishi told them they could be as free with the facts as they wanted as long as it was interesting. Uchida wrote "I believe that Japanese films have to change. They have to look outward and overseas. This series was made with just that thought in mind."

On August 15, 2019, the series was renewed by Netflix for a second season. In January 2020, The Nikkei wrote that the season would follow Muranishi's downfall, mirroring Japan's economic slump of the early 1990s. The second season was released on June 24, 2021.

Casting
Alongside the initial series announcement, it was confirmed that Takayuki Yamada, Shinnosuke Mitsushima and Tetsuji Tamayama would star in the series. Take revealed that Yamada was attached to the show from the very beginning, and said that Misato Morita "totally became Kuroki in her mind. She didn't resemble her, but her voice became exactly the same." In July 2019, it was announced that Jade Albany Pietrantonio would star in the series.

Filming
Principal photography for the first season took place in 2018. In January 2020, The Nikkei reported that production for season two would begin in the spring.

Release

Marketing 
On June 25, 2019, the official trailer for the series was released.

Reception
HuffPost columnist Soichiro Matsutani called the first season of The Naked Director a "masterpiece" and compared it to the acclaimed films The People vs. Larry Flynt and Boogie Nights. He praised the show's depiction of the early days of Japan's adult video industry, particularly how it showed the connections between the AV industry, the criminal underworld, and the police, something the original book did not. Another difference from the source material that Matsutani noted, is how the porn industry is never portrayed as a bright and glamorous world; it features characters who suffer from the social stigma often directed at those who work in the profession.

Describing the show as a "raucous sex comedy and action-packed underworld narrative in [a] tale of a pornographic revolution," Brenden Gallagher of The Daily Dot gave The Naked Director 3  out of 5 stars. He praised the show for immersing the audience in Japanese culture, Yamada's performance, and the writing for melding humor and emotion. However, he criticized some of the supporting cast for being unable to balance the seriousness and humor. Unlike Gallagher however, The Daily Beasts Jordan Julian called the show's switching between comedy and drama "whiplash-inducing at times" but said as the season progresses it begins to "feel more like a crime show than anything else—a Japanese interpretation of Breaking Bad." John Serba of Decider called the first episode "funny and colorful", Yamada a strong lead, and the supporting cast "mostly inspired", and recommended the show. Both Serba and Gallagher compared The Naked Director to Californication.

Reviewing season two for Thrillist, Joshua Robinson called it "A Whirlwind Of Brilliant Highs & Overindulgent Lows". Although praising Yamada's "spirited—and at times, villainous—performance" as absolutely brilliant, he wrote that "The novelty and shock value of the comedic drama has faded away, despite the show's poignant storylines, and many of the show's best characters have either died or moved on from the world of porn when it's all said and done."

Masae Ido of Gendai Business criticized the series for depicting Muranishi as a sexual liberator and advocate for women despite his real-life opinions, such as a tweet that said "The female lawyers who spearhead the feminist movement on the porn coercion issue all look like they attract no men", which she found "divergent" from the depiction. Iku Okada of Newsweek Japan found advertisements for the series to be "glorifying the sex industry of a time when unjust exploitation was commonplace", and wrote that the character of Muranishi "never reflects on his own shameful revenge or the misogyny that can be felt behind it".

The series was also criticized for depicting Kaoru Kuroki using her real stage name without her permission. In a 1994 interview, Kuroki stated that she had suffered physical violence from Muranishi. She retired from public life the same year and has successfully sued publishers for privacy infringement. When asked about the criticism, Netflix stated that neither Kuroki nor Muranishi were involved in the production and that the series is merely an adaptation of Motohashi's book.

References

External links
 
 

Japanese-language Netflix original programming
2010s comedy-drama television series
2019 Japanese television series debuts
2021 Japanese television series endings
Television shows based on Japanese novels
Television series based on actual events
Japanese-language television shows
Television series set in the 1980s
Television series set in the 1990s
Television shows set in Japan
Japanese drama television series
Casual sex in television
Obscenity controversies in television
Works about pornography
Works about the Yakuza
Television controversies in Japan